Karishma Mookhey  is an Indian television and cinema actress.

Career
Karishma started her career with the title role of Dollie in Star Plus's Hello Dollie, produced by Sagar Arts. She has acted in a movie, Perfect Husband and has presented The Will Power, a documentary for the BBC.

Karishma was seen in Sahara One's Doli Saja Ke, Woh Rehne Waali Mehlon Ki, Naaginn and a role in Lo Ho Gayi Pooja Iss Ghar Ki has been announced.

Karishma was also seen playing the role of Tara Vadhera in the 2005–06 TV show India Calling that aired on Star One. She played the role of Naintara Singh Rathore in the 2010–11 TV show Geet – Hui Sabse Parayi. But she did not continue when the role was revived after a break for her family commitments.

Since then, she has switched careers and is a partner in an information technology venture with her husband, K. K. Mookhey.

Television

Personal life
Randhawa married Kanwal Mookhey, a businessman involved in information technology consultancy and the brother of former Miss World, Yukta Mookhey.

References

External links

Indian television actresses
Indian voice actresses
Living people
Actresses in Hindi television
Female models from Chandigarh
Actresses from Chandigarh
21st-century Indian actresses
1980 births